José Espinosa may refer to:
 José Luis Espinosa, Mexican boxer
 José Roberto Espinosa, Mexican commentator for American football 
 José Rangel Espinosa, Mexican politician
 José Martín Espinosa de los Monteros, Spanish pilot and mathematics professor
 José Luis Espinosa Piña, Mexican politician
 José Miguel Espinosa, Spanish swimmer

See also
 José Espinoza (disambiguation)